Carlos Fernández Liria (born 1959) is a Spanish philosopher and lecturer at the Complutense University of Madrid (UCM).

Biography 
He was born in 1959 in Zaragoza. Fernández Liria, who started his teaching experience as professor of secondary education, also worked as TV writer alongside fellow philosopher Santiago Alba in the 1980s, developing the scripts for the cult children's show La Bola de Cristal. Following the earning of a PhD in philosophy at the UCM, reading a dissertation about Jean-Paul Sartre in 1987 titled Una ontología positiva. Ensayo a partir de “El ser y la nada” de Sartre supervised by Sergio Rábade Romeo (initiated under the supervision of Gabriel Albiac), he became a senior lecturer at the former university in 1989.

He has been the doctoral supervisor of, among others, César Rendueles and Luis Alegre.

He is the father of Eduardo Fernández Rubiño, politician and activist.

Political positions 
Fernández Liria self-identifies as Marxist "since forever". He has stood out as staunch supporter of the Bolivarian Revolution in Venezuela. An admirer of Julio Anguita, he lent support to Podemos in the beginnings of the party; the purpose of his work En defensa del populismo, in which he outlines a reinterpretation of the Enlightenment and Rousseau, has been described as essentially an apology of the party. Later, in 2019, he removed support from Podemos and endorsed Más Madrid and Más País instead along his disciple Luis Alegre.

Works 

Author
 
 
 
 

Coauthor

References 
Informational notes

Citations

Bibliography
 
 
 
 
 
 
 
 
 
 
 
 
 
 
 
 

Academic staff of the Complutense University of Madrid
Complutense University of Madrid alumni
Spanish philosophers
Spanish television writers
Male television writers
1959 births
Living people
Spanish male writers